George Frederick Larson (June 10, 1912 – September 20, 2008) was a Canadian freestyle swimmer who competed in the 1932 Summer Olympics and 1936 Summer Olympics.

At the 1932 Olympics in Los Angeles, he was a member of the Canadian team that finished fourth in the men's 4x200-metre freestyle relay.  In the 400-metre freestyle, he was eliminated in the first round.

Four years later at the 1936 Olympics in Berlin, he was eliminated in the first round of the 100-metre freestyle contest.

At the 1934 British Empire Games,  he was a member of the Canadian team which won the gold medal in the 4×200-yard freestyle relay. He also won a silver medal in the 100-yard freestyle competition and finished fourth in the 440-yard freestyle, and sixth in the 1500-yard freestyle.

After his swimming career concluded, Larson played Canadian football for the Hamilton Tigers and Hamilton Wildcats, the predecessors of the modern-era Hamilton Tiger-Cats of the CFL.  While later working as a police officer, he earned extra income as a professional wrestler under the pseudonym "Irish Tom Collins" for fifteen years.

Larson was born in Hamilton, Ontario; he died in Hamilton in 2008, aged 96.

See also
 List of Commonwealth Games medallists in swimming (men)

External links

George Larson's obituary 

1912 births
2008 deaths
Canadian male freestyle swimmers
Commonwealth Games gold medallists for Canada
Commonwealth Games silver medallists for Canada
Olympic swimmers of Canada
Sportspeople from Hamilton, Ontario
Swimmers at the 1932 Summer Olympics
Swimmers at the 1934 British Empire Games
Swimmers at the 1936 Summer Olympics
Commonwealth Games medallists in swimming
Players of Canadian football from Ontario
Hamilton Wildcats football players
Hamilton Tigers football players
Medallists at the 1934 British Empire Games